St. Mark's Episcopal Church is located on US 9W in the hamlet of Fort Montgomery, New York, United States. It is a small building in the Tudorbethan architectural style, with random stone and lancet stained glass windows on either side.

It was built in 1923 in anticipation of the completion of the Bear Mountain Bridge and the bridge over Popolopen Creek to the south. It served the many weekend travelers and vacationers who came into the area once it became more accessible when those bridges opened the next year. In 1982 it was listed on the National Register of Historic Places as part of the Hudson Highlands Multiple Resource Area multiple property submission.

See also

National Register of Historic Places listings in Orange County, New York

References

Churches completed in 1923
Chapels in the United States
Churches on the National Register of Historic Places in New York (state)
National Register of Historic Places in Orange County, New York
U.S. Route 9W
Highlands, New York
Churches in Orange County, New York